The Forest is a 2009 Indian film written and directed by Ashvin Kumar and produced by Kumar and Judith James. The lead role is to Ankur Vikal and the film is shot at the Corbett National Park.

Cast
 Ankur Vikal as Pritam
 Javed Jaffrey as Abhishek
 Salim Ali Zaidi as Arjun
 Nandana Sen as Radha
 Tarun Shukla as Bhola Ram

References

External links
 Official Website
 
 The Forest at Movie Talkies

2009 films
2000s Hindi-language films